Lord William Charles Augustus Cavendish-Bentinck (20 May 178028 April 1826), known as Lord Charles Bentinck, was a British soldier and politician and a great-great-grandfather of Queen Elizabeth II.

Background
Bentinck was the third son of British Prime Minister William Cavendish-Bentinck, 3rd Duke of Portland and Lady Dorothy (1750–1794), only daughter of Prime Minister William Cavendish, 4th Duke of Devonshire. William Bentinck, 4th Duke of Portland, and Lord William Bentinck were his elder brothers.

He was born on 20 May 1780 at Burlington House, Piccadilly.

Political career
Bentinck was returned to Parliament for Ashburton in 1806, a seat he held until 1812. He served under the Earl of Liverpool as Treasurer of the Household between 1812 and 1826.

Family
Bentinck married, firstly, Georgiana Augusta Frederica Seymour (baptised Elliott) (1782 – 10 December 1813), daughter of the courtesan Grace Elliott on 21 September 1808; she was said to be a daughter of the Prince of Wales or of the 4th Earl of Cholmondeley, both men claiming her paternity. They had one daughter, who was raised after Georgiana's death by Lord Cholmondeley at Cholmondeley Castle:
 Hon. Georgiana Augusta Frederica Henrietta Cavendish Bentinck (21 August 1811 – 12 September 1883).

The marriage enabled Bentinck to become Treasurer of the Household in 1812, a position he held till death, despite his involvement in a notorious divorce suit and his subsequent remarriage.

In 1815, Bentinck eloped with his mistress, Anne, Lady Abdy, natural daughter of Richard Wellesley, 1st Marquess Wellesley by Hyacinthe-Gabrielle Roland. Lady Abdy was the wife of Bentinck's friend Sir William Abdy, 7th Baronet. Following the elopement, Lady Abdy was divorced by her husband. She and Bentinck were married on 23 July 1816. They had four children:
 Reverend Charles William Frederick Cavendish-Bentinck (8 November 181717 August 1865). He was a great-grandfather of Queen Elizabeth II through his daughter, who married the 14th Earl of Strathmore and Kinghorne.
 Hon. Anne Hyacinthe Cavendish-Bentinck (1 September 18167 June 1888), christened on 14 May 1818. Died in Cannes in 1888, unmarried.
 Lieutenant General Arthur Cavendish-Bentinck (10 May 181911 December 1877). He married first Elizabeth Sophia Hawkins-Whitshed. They were parents of William Cavendish-Bentinck, 6th Duke of Portland. He married secondly Augusta Browne, 1st Baroness Bolsover, and they had three sons and a daughter, Lady Ottoline Morrell.
 Hon. Emily Cavendish-Bentinck (18206 June 1850), married Henry Hopwood.

Abdy-Cavendish divorce
Anne and Lord Charles became lovers at some point during her first marriage. They eloped on 5 September 1815, following which Abdy brought a suit for criminal conversation (crim.con. in Regency parlance) for 30,000 pounds but won only 7,000 pounds in damages.  (These damages were never paid by the impecunious Bentinck). During the discussion of the divorce bill, the customary provision against remarriage was struck out in the House of Lords.  Lady Abdy (or rather, her husband Sir William Abdy)  was granted a divorce on 25 June 1816. Anne and Lord Charles were married on 23 July 1816, enabling their first child (which she was expecting) to be born legitimate three weeks later.

Bentinck collapsed and died suddenly at age 45 while undressing at his apartment in Park Lane, and was quickly discovered by his footman. Dr. Sir Henry Halford diagnosed a blood aneurysm as cause of death. His wife survived him by almost 50 years and died in March 1875.

Ancestors

References

External links 
 Major. Joanne & Murden.Sarah A Right Royal Scandal: Two Marriage That Change History
 
 The History of Parliament: CAVENDISH BENTINCK, Lord William Charles Augustus (1780–1826)

1780 births
1826 deaths
Children of prime ministers of the United Kingdom
C
Members of the Privy Council of the United Kingdom
Treasurers of the Household
Younger sons of dukes
Grenadier Guards officers
Members of the Parliament of the United Kingdom for Ashburton
UK MPs 1807–1812
Deaths from aneurysm